Krosino may refer to:

Krosino, Łobez County, in West Pomeranian Voivodeship (north-west Poland)
Krosino, Szczecinek County, in West Pomeranian Voivodeship (north-west Poland)
Krosino, Świdwin County, in West Pomeranian Voivodeship (north-west Poland)

See also
Krosinko
Krosno (disambiguation)